Novas is a surname. Notable people with the surname include:

Fernando Novas (born 1960), Argentine paleontologist
Himilce Novas (born 1944), Cuban-American writer
Manuel de Novas (1938–2009), Cape Verdean poet and composer
Yndys Novas (born 1977), Dominican volleyball player